Claire Charlotte Dorothée Gauthier, known as Clarisse Vigoureux, (11 June 1789 in Montagney – 13 January 1865 in San Antonio) was a French Fourierist journalist and writer.

Biography
The daughter of a blacksmith, Clarisse Vigoureux was born in Montagney (Doubs) in 1789. She married François Vigoureux, a cloth merchant in Besançon, who committed suicide in 1817 by poisoning himself because he was accused by public rumour of being the cause of the famine that was then raging in Besançon.

A friend and correspondent of the founder of the movement, Charles Fourier, she became a journalist, wrote for “La Phalange” and introduced Victor Considerant, who had come to prepare for Polytechnique at Besançon College, to Fourierism in 1824.

In 1834, following a "religious emotion" provoked by Lamennais' book “Paroles d'un Croyant” (“Words of a Believer”), she published “Parole de Providence”, a Fourierist response to the theories of Lamennais, “in which she sees an apology for class struggle and violence that are the antithesis of the Fourierist conception of universal harmony.”

She then became the collaborator in Paris of her son-in-law Victor Considerant, who became the undisputed leader of the Societary School after Fourier's death. After the 13 June 1849, the failure of an insurrection against Louis Napoléon obliged Clarisse and Victor Considerant to go into exile in Belgium. On an invitation by Albert Brisbane and helped by Jean-Baptiste Godin, between 1855 and 1857 they founded the colony La Réunion in Texas on Fourier's principles.

Although more than 350 European colonists eventually made La Réunion their home, the experiment was already beginning to fail as the population began to leave. Some returned to Europe while others moved out of the area.

Following this failure, Clarisse Vigoureux died on 13 January 1865. “She was buried in the garden of her San Antonio home. Here Victor would give homage to the woman who had introduced him to his life's work and had supported him and the ideas of Fourier for over 40 years.”

References

19th-century French journalists
19th-century French women writers
Fourierists
French women writers
Utopian socialists
1789 births
1865 deaths